The Ocean Spray Hotel (also known as the Carol Arms Hotel) is a historic hotel in Miami Beach, Florida, United States built in 1937. It is located at 4130 Collins Avenue (Mid-Beach). On June 2, 2004, it was added to the U.S. National Register of Historic Places.

The architects of the building were M. L. Hampton Associates, and the builders were Belsham & Hampton.

The Ocean Spray Hotel is an example of original Art-Deco architecture which is outside the Art-Deco-District of Miami Beach.

References

External links

 Miami-Dade County listings at National Register of Historic Places
 Official website

Hotels in Miami Beach, Florida
National Register of Historic Places in Miami-Dade County, Florida
Hotel buildings on the National Register of Historic Places in Florida
Art Deco architecture in Florida
Residential buildings completed in 1936
Hotels established in 1936
Hotel buildings completed in 1936